Cresswell v Board of Inland Revenue [1984] ICR 508 is a UK labour law case concerning the contract of employment.

Facts
Mr Cresswell worked as a tax officer. He and others were required by the Inland Revenue to start using computerised record systems (COP 1) to calculate people's taxes and sending out letters. Some of them, including Cresswell, preferred the old method of paper files. The contracts specified the work merely in general terms. Cresswell wanted a declaration that the change was a breach of contract.

Judgment
Walton J dismissed the claim, holding that the new changes could legitimately be introduced. He noted that the changes here were not that ‘esoteric’, and the workers had been given proper training.

See also

UK labour law
Employment contract in English law
Autoclenz Ltd v Belcher [2011] UKSC 41

References

United Kingdom labour case law
United Kingdom employment contract case law
High Court of Justice cases
1984 in case law
1984 in British law
HM Revenue and Customs